This is list of Acts of Senedd Cymru (referred to as Acts of the National Assembly for Wales if passed before 6 May 2020) and Measures of the National Assembly for Wales, passed by  (the Welsh Parliament; or simply the Senedd) from its establishment as the National Assembly for Wales in 1999 until the present. Following the passing of the Government of Wales Act 2006, the (then) National Assembly was conferred with the power to pass Measures on 3 May 2007. It has no longer been possible for the Senedd to pass Measures since 5 May 2011, when it was instead conferred with the power to pass Acts of Senedd Cymru (then known as Acts of the National Assembly for Wales) following a referendum. On 6 May 2020, the National Assembly for Wales was renamed Senedd Cymru (or, in English, the Welsh Parliament).

 List of Measures of the National Assembly for Wales from 2008
 List of Measures of the National Assembly for Wales from 2009
 List of Measures of the National Assembly for Wales from 2010
 List of Measures of the National Assembly for Wales from 2011
 List of Acts of the National Assembly for Wales from 2012
 List of Acts of the National Assembly for Wales from 2013
 List of Acts of the National Assembly for Wales from 2014
 List of Acts of the National Assembly for Wales from 2015
 List of Acts of the National Assembly for Wales from 2016
 List of Acts of the National Assembly for Wales from 2017
 List of Acts of the National Assembly for Wales from 2018
 List of Acts of the National Assembly for Wales from 2019
 List of Acts of the National Assembly for Wales and Acts of Senedd Cymru from 2020
 List of Acts of Senedd Cymru from 2021
 List of Acts of Senedd Cymru from 2022
 List of Acts of Senedd Cymru from 2023

References